Sheila Colleen Bair (born April 3, 1954) is an American civil servant who was the 19th Chair of the U.S. Federal Deposit Insurance Corporation (FDIC) from 2006 to 2011, during which time she shortly after taking charge of the FDIC in June 2006 began warning of the potential systemic risks posed by the growing trend of subprime-mortgage-backed bonds, and then later assumed a prominent role in the government's response to the 2008 financial crisis. She was appointed to the post for a five-year term on June 26, 2006, by George W. Bush through July 8, 2011. She was subsequently the 28th president of Washington College in Chestertown, MD, the first female head of the college in its 234-year history, a position she held from 2015 until her resignation in 2017.

Early life
Bair is a native of Independence, Kansas. Her father, Albert, was a surgeon. Her mother, Clara, was a nurse and housewife. She received her bachelor's degree in philosophy from the University of Kansas in 1975, and worked as a bank teller for a brief period, before receiving a J.D. from the University of Kansas School of Law in 1978.  In 1981, she was recruited by Senator Bob Dole, a Republican from her state, to serve as counsel on his staff in Washington.

Career

Pre-FDIC career 
Prior to her appointment at the FDIC, Bair was the Dean's Professor of Financial Regulatory Policy for the Isenberg School of Management at the University of Massachusetts Amherst, a post she had held since 2002. She also served as Assistant Secretary for Financial Institutions at the U.S. Department of the Treasury (2001 to 2002), Senior Vice President for Government Relations of the New York Stock Exchange (1995 to 2000), a Commissioner and Acting Chair of the Commodity Futures Trading Commission (1991 to 1995), and Research Director, Deputy Counsel and Counsel to Kansas Republican Senate Majority Leader Bob Dole (1981 to 1988).

While an academic, Bair also served on the FDIC's Advisory Committee on Banking Policy. Bair also pursued a seat in the U.S. Congress (she lost the 1990 Republican nomination in the 5th Kansas district by 760 votes to Dick Nichols). Bair began her career in the General Counsel's office of the former U.S. Department of Health, Education, and Welfare.

FDIC tenure 
Bair was appointed to the 19th Chair of the U.S. Federal Deposit Insurance Corporation (FDIC) on June 26, 2006, by George W. Bush. She left the FDIC on July 8, 2011, when her five-year term expired. She became a senior advisor to The Pew Charitable Trusts in August 2011. She is chair emerita of the Systemic Risk Council, a volunteer effort formed by the CFA Institute and the Pew Charitable Trusts to monitor and comment on regulation. Bair's book  Bull by the Horns: Fighting to Save Main Street from Wall Street and Wall Street from Itself  was published September 25, 2012. The book was a New York Times and Wall Street Journal best seller. Bair has also written several books for children in a series published by Albert Whitman called Money Tales. Her books encourage savings and teach money basics: Rock, Brock and the Savings Shock (2006), Isabel's Car Wash (2008), Bullies of Wall Street (2015), Billy the Borrowing Blue Footed Booby (2021), Princess Persephone Loses the Castle (2021), Shark Scam (2022) and Princess Persephone Loses the Castle (2022).

Post-FDIC career 
In May 2015, Bair was appointed president of Washington College, becoming the first female head of the college in its 234-year history. During her tenure as president, Bair helped implement several debt-reducing programs aimed at making a degree more affordable, including “Fixedfor4,” which guarantees tuition costs will not rise for students during their four years at college, and “Dam the Debt,” which awards scholarships to graduating seniors to help pay off federal student loans. Bair resigned on June 30, 2017, citing the demands of the job and insufficient time with her family.

Since leaving government service, Bair has served on a number of corporate boards. She is currently on the boards of Bunge Limited, Lion Electric, and Fannie Mae. In November 2020, Bair was named the first woman Chair of Fannie Mae's board of directors. Bair previously was on the boards of Host Hotels & Resorts, the state-run Industrial and Commercial Bank of China (2017 to 2020), Thomson Reuters and Santander. She was criticized for joining the board of Santander, a Spanish banking group, which critics viewed as inconsistent with her public views on the revolving door. She has also served on a number of nonprofit boards, including as a founding director of the Volcker Alliance, the Center for Responsible Lending, the RAND Corporation, and the National Women's Law Center.

In 2021, Bair was appointed to a group advising the International Financial Reporting Standards Foundation (IFRS) on setting up the International Sustainability Standards Board (ISSB), which aims to create a set of global standards for firms reporting the impact of climate change. Also in 2021, Ms. Bair was appointed a trustee of Economists for Peace and Security, a group of renowned economists and public servants concerned about issues of peace, conflict, war, and the world economy.

Bair is married to Scott P. Cooper and has two children, Preston and Colleen.

2008 financial crisis
Bair assumed a prominent role in the government's response to the 2008 financial crisis, working alongside and sometimes publicly opposing Treasury Secretary Hank Paulson and Tim Geithner, then president of the New York Federal Reserve. She also helped shape the resulting Dodd–Frank Wall Street Reform and Consumer Protection Act of 2010.

Shortly after taking charge of the FDIC in June 2006, Bair began warning of the potential systemic risks posed by the growing trend of subprime-mortgage-backed bonds. In the spring of 2007 she met privately with industry executives, urging them to modify adjustable-rate mortgages rather than allow homes to go into foreclosure, which could set off a cascading effect throughout the economy. In October 2007, Bair took her argument public with an op-ed in The New York Times.

Within the Bush administration, Bair's mortgage modification argument was initially at odds with the Treasury Secretary who believed such action would have little effect. Bair also resisted many of the government bailouts of insolvent banks; rather she argued that the government should impose greater accountability by forcing those institutions to sell off bad assets, replace management and re-privatize them, more akin to how the FDIC handles smaller banks. Bair argued that when companies are viewed as “too big to fail” it leads to reckless behavior because there is an implicit guarantee of government support. Bair favored “market discipline,” meaning shareholders and bondholders would take losses when an institutional fails.

Bair fought against the Federal Reserve's adoption of the Basel II advanced approaches, which would have allowed large banks to use their own internal models to help set their regulatory capital requirements. In the aftermath of the crisis, Bair pressed the Basel Committee on Banking Supervision to adopt strong capital and leverage standards. She successfully argued for international adoption of ‘Leverage Ratio’ – a strict capital requirement applying to all of a bank's assets to complement more subjective capital standards based on the perceived riskiness of a bank's assets.

The Troubled Asset Relief Program included a mortgage-relief plan partially modeled on Bair's loan-modification ideas. Following the crisis, the Dodd–Frank Wall Street Reform and Consumer Protection Act was drafted with a number of provisions Bair sought, including the FDIC's expanded powers to seize large financial institutions, place agency examiners on-site within banks, recover pay from executives deemed responsible for an institution's failure, and the requirement of banks to create a ‘Living Will’ as a guide for orderly resolution.

In a fictional TV movie about the crises, Patricia Randell played Bair in the 2011 HBO movie Too Big to Fail, based on the popular book of the same name by New York Times journalist Andrew Ross Sorkin.

2020 Coronavirus pandemic 
In March 2020, Bair called for the Federal Reserve to focus on getting credit flowing to U.S. businesses affected by the spreading coronavirus and workers losing their jobs. In an op-ed for the Financial Times, Bair called for the Federal Reserve and other central banks to require systemically important banks to suspend discretionary bonuses, dividends and shareholder buybacks in order to impede losses while expanding their balance sheets to support increased borrowing from businesses hurt by the pandemic. The Bank of England and European Central Bank subsequently pressed their banks to do so.

Reputation
In 2009, Bair was named one of Time magazine's "Time 100" most influential people. In 2008, Bair topped The Wall Street Journal's annual 50 "Women to Watch List." In 2008 and 2009, Forbes ranked her as the second most powerful woman in the world behind German chancellor Angela Merkel. Forbes described her FDIC office as "the last stop for capital-starved banks (and their insured customers) before going under."

Awards
Bair received the John F. Kennedy Profile in Courage Award and Hubert H. Humphrey Civil Rights Award.

In 2009, Bair was presented the Consumer Federation of America's Philip Hart Public Service Award. 
In 2011, Bair was named of named one of America's Top Leaders by The Washington Post and Harvard's Center for Public Leadership.

On March 29, 2012, Bair was honored by the Romney Institute of Public Management (BYU Marriott School of Management) as the Administrator of the Year.

Publications

References

External links
 
 
 
 
 

|-

|-

|-

1954 births
American chairpersons of corporations
American women in business
Chairpersons of non-governmental organizations
Chairs of the Federal Deposit Insurance Corporation
Chairwomen
Commodity Futures Trading Commission personnel
Kansas Republicans
Living people
New York Stock Exchange people
People from Independence, Kansas
Presidents of Washington College
United States Assistant Secretaries of the Treasury
University of Kansas School of Law alumni
University of Massachusetts Amherst faculty
Women business executives
Women heads of universities and colleges
Industrial and Commercial Bank of China people
George W. Bush administration personnel
Clinton administration personnel
Obama administration personnel
21st-century American women